Rajendra Mulak was a Minister of State for Finance & Planning, Energy, Water Resources, Parliamentary Affairs and State Excise in the chief minister Prithviraj Chavan Government of Maharashtra. He has studied Post Graduation in Commerce and has a Degree in Law. Mulak's constituency Umred that he had represented was declared reserved for scheduled caste seat. But he was elected in 2009 as an Maharashtra Legislative Council MLC.

Personal life 
Rajendra Mulak is the son of late Shri 	Bhausaheb Mulak an ex- Minister in the Government of Maharashtra he was also the Mayor of Nagpur city. Rajendra Mulak was married to Rajashree Mulak and has two children Son Yashraj and daughter Tanushree. After a prolonged illness he lost his wife on 16 November 2007. He then Prerna Mulak(Daughter of Ex.Minister Shri.Vijay Patil)

Political career 
Rajendra Mulak was first elected as an  Maharashtra Legislative Assembly MLA from the Umred  constituency in 2004.

Positions held
Minister of State for finance Government of Maharashtra
MLA from 2004 to 2009 from the Umred  constituency
MLC

References 

Indian National Congress politicians
Indian Hindus
Living people
Members of the Maharashtra Legislative Council
Politicians from Nagpur
Year of birth missing (living people)